The 774–775 carbon-14 spike is an observed increase of 1.2% in the concentration of carbon-14 isotope in tree rings dated to 774 or 775 CE, which is about 20 times as high as the normal background rate of variation. It was discovered during a study of Japanese cedar trees, with the year of occurrence determined through dendrochronology. A surge in beryllium isotope , detected in Antarctic ice cores, has also been associated with the 774–775 event. It is known as the Miyake event or the Charlemagne event and it produced the largest and most rapid rise in carbon-14 ever recorded.

The event appears to have been global, with the same carbon-14 signal found in tree rings from Germany, Russia, the United States, Finland and New Zealand.

The signal exhibits a sharp increase of around 1.2% followed by a slow decline (see Figure 1), which is typical for an instant production of carbon-14 in the atmosphere, indicating that the event was short in duration.

Hypotheses
Several possible causes of the event have been considered.

The "red crucifix" recorded by the Anglo-Saxon Chronicle has been variously hypothesised to have been a supernova or the aurora borealis.

In China, there is only one clear reference to an aurora in the mid-770s, namely the one on 12 January 776. Instead, an anomalous "thunderstorm" was recorded for 775.

The common paradigm is that the event was caused by a solar particle event (SPE), or a consequence of events as often happen, from a very strong solar flare, perhaps the strongest ever known but still within the Sun's abilities. According to a summary of the state of knowledge on radiocarbon dating in 2020, the spike is thought to have been caused by an extreme SPE.

In 2022, a study of an extreme solar particle storm near a solar minimum 9125 years BP (7176 BCE), showed one of the largest  enhancements detected in ice cores. Furthermore, the reconstruction of the / enhancement ratio suggests that this SPE event was similar or even larger than the 774/75 CE event in terms of energy (>30 MeV). The implication is the magnitude and frequency of occurrence of a potential worst-case scenario for SPE events is increased. The study also provides evidence that the 7176 BCE event occurred near a solar minimum.

Another 2022 study using the tree-ring radiocarbon record (also) concluded that Miyake events don't appear to be caused by the solar cycle (i.e. solar flares) as thought previously and have extended durations. They occurred every ~1,000 years on average and may threaten global technologies this century.

Frequency of similar events

The event of 774 is the strongest spike over the last 11,000 years in the record of cosmogenic isotopes, but it is not unique. Several other events of the same kind are also suspected to have occurred during the Holocene epoch.

From these statistics, one may expect that such strong events occur once per tens of millennia, while weaker events may occur once per millennium or even century. The event of 774 did not cause catastrophic consequences for life on Earth, but had it happened in modern times, it might have produced catastrophic damage to modern technology, particularly to communication and space-borne navigation systems. In addition, a solar flare capable of producing the observed isotopic effect would pose considerable risk to astronauts.

As of 2017, there is "little understanding" of  past variations because annual-resolution measurements are available for only a few periods (such as 774–775). In 2017, another "extraordinarily large"  increase (2.0%) has been associated with a 5480 BCE event, but it is not associated with a solar event because of its long duration, but rather to an unusually fast grand minimum of solar activity. Analysis is hindered by the lack of yearly radiocarbon numbers for earlier dates.

See also
 List of solar storms
 Carrington Event

References

External links
 

774
775
Geomagnetic storms
Stratigraphy
Dendrology